Yun Ji-hye may refer to:

 Yoon Ji-hye (born 1979), South Korean actress
 Yun Ji-hye (table tennis) (born 1983)
 Yun Ji-hye (born 1997), South Korean taekwondo practitioner